The Bandits of Cold River (Spanish:Los bandidos de Río Frío) is a 1956 Mexican western film directed by Rogelio A. González and starring Luis Aguilar, César del Campo and Dagoberto Rodríguez.

The film's sets were designed by the art director Francisco Marco Chillet.

Cast
 Luis Aguilar as Juan Robreño 
 César del Campo as Fernando de los Monteros, Marqués de Valle Alegre  
 Dagoberto Rodríguez as Evaristo  
 Fernando Casanova as Marcos, adulto 
 Rita Macedo as Mariana del Sauz  
 Fernando Soto as Hilario 
 Prudencia Grifell as Agustina  
 Miguel Ángel Ferriz as Padre de Juan  
 Alfredo Varela as Lic. Lamparilla 
 Víctor Velázquez as Coronel Barinelli  
 Ernesto Finance as Señor presidente  
 Georgina Barragán as Doña Cecilia  
 Lupe Inclán as Yerbera  
 Enriqueta Reza as Yerbera  
 Berta Cervera as Tule, sirvienta 
 Rogelio Fernández as Emperador, militar  
 Manuel Vergara 'Manver' as José el tuerto  
 Carmen Manzano as Pantaleona, criada de Cecilia  
 José Chávez as Tendero 
 José María Linares-Rivas
 Gregorio Acosta as José el largo  
 Julio Ahuet as Cochero  
 Daniel Arroyo as Hombre asaltado 
 Victorio Blanco as Campesino anciano  
 Guillermo Bravo Sosa as Borracho  
 Enedina Díaz de León as Tía Panchita  
 Vicente Lara as José  
 Rosa María Montes as Cantante de ópera asaltado 
 Inés Murillo as Vecina de Panchita  
 Francisco Pando as Celso Barajas 
 José Pardavé
 Nicolás Rodríguez hijo as Marcos, adolescente

References

Bibliography 
 William H. Beezley & Linda Ann Curcio. Latin American Popular Culture Since Independence: An Introduction. Rowman & Littlefield, 2012.

External links 
 

1956 films
1956 Western (genre) films
Mexican Western (genre) films
1950s Spanish-language films
Films directed by Rogelio A. González
1950s Mexican films
Mexican black-and-white films